Gunnar Leósson (12 February 1936 – 30 July 1965) was an Icelandic footballer. He played in one match for the Iceland national football team in 1957.

References

External links
 

1936 births
1965 deaths
Gunnar Leosson
Gunnar Leosson
Place of birth missing
Association footballers not categorized by position